Appearances is a 1921 British drama film directed by Donald Crisp. Alfred Hitchcock is credited as a title designer. It is a lost film.

Cast
 David Powell as Herbert Seaton
 Mary Glynne as Kitty Mitchell
 Langhorn Burton as Sir William Rutherford
 Mary Dibley as Lady Rutherford
 Marjorie Hume as Agnes
 Percy Standing as Dawkins

See also
Alfred Hitchcock filmography
List of lost films

References

External links

1921 films
1921 drama films
1921 lost films
British drama films
British silent feature films
British black-and-white films
Films directed by Donald Crisp
Lost British films
Lost drama films
1920s British films
Silent drama films